Carolina Nissen (born April 21, 1976, Valdivia) is a Chilean singer. She debuted in 2010 with an album of pop-like songs.

Nissen studied piano at the Conservatory of Music at the Universidad Austral de Chile and then pedagogy in music education at the same university.

Discography

References

External links
 Official website

1976 births
Living people
People from Valdivia
21st-century Chilean women singers
Austral University of Chile alumni
Musicians from Valdivia